Norlina is a town in Warren County, North Carolina, United States. The population was 1,118 at the 2010 census.

Geography
Norlina is located at  (36.444690, -78.194059).

Demographics

2020 census

As of the 2020 United States census, there were 920 people, 537 households, and 266 families residing in the town.

2000 census
As of the census of 2000, there were 1,107 people, 482 households, and 300 families residing in the town. The population density was 986.0 people per square mile (381.6/km). There were 534 housing units at an average density of 475.6 per square mile (184.1/km). The racial makeup of the town was 57.36% White, 41.46% African American, 0.09% Native American, 0.72% from other races, and 0.36% from two or more races. Hispanic or Latino of any race were 1.36% of the population.

There were 482 households, out of which 28.0% had children under the age of 18 living with them, 38.2% were married couples living together, 21.2% had a female householder with no husband present, and 37.6% were non-families. 34.0% of all households were made up of individuals, and 18.3% had someone living alone who was 65 years of age or older. The average household size was 2.30 and the average family size was 2.96.

In the town, the population was spread out, with 24.4% under the age of 18, 9.4% from 18 to 24, 25.1% from 25 to 44, 21.7% from 45 to 64, and 19.4% who were 65 years of age or older. The median age was 39 years. For every 100 females, there were 83.0 males. For every 100 females age 18 and over, there were 77.0 males.

The median income for a household in the town was $25,300, and the median income for a family was $28,125. Males had a median income of $23,182 versus $21,354 for females. The per capita income for the town was $12,355. About 12.9% of families and 18.8% of the population were below the poverty line, including 27.9% of those under age 18 and 23.4% of those age 65 or over.

History

Norlina was first called the "Ridgeway Junction" in 1837.  As a railroad passed through this area, many citizens started to sell wood and water to the railroad.  Eventually this began to expand, and in the 1860s the name changed to the "Woodyard".  By the 1870s, the area had grown in business, and was referred to as the "Junction".  The Seaboard & Raleigh Railroad had just been formed, and the "Junction" was now thriving with its business.  A small community was formed, including two hardware stores, a horse drawn taxi service, and smithing shops.  By 1900, John Williams established the Seaboard Air Line Railway and it grew to over 4,680 miles.  This small group of people had turned the railway stop into a real town.  In 1913 the name Norlina was coined, being a portmanteau of the beginning of "North" and the ending  of "Carolina".

See also

 Soul City, North Carolina

References

External links
 Official website of Norlina, NC

Towns in North Carolina
Towns in Warren County, North Carolina